Walter Jean was an American football coach.  He was the second head football coach at Bowling Green State Normal School—now known as Bowling Green State University—serving for one season in 1920 and compiling a record of 1–4.

Head coaching record

References

Year of birth missing
Year of death missing
Bowling Green Falcons football coaches